Kirk Morrison is an American poker player.

Morrison's poker tournament accomplishments include winning a 1998 World Series of Poker bracelet in seven-card stud and winning second place at the Season Five World Poker Tour championship event. This second place, which paid $2,011,135 is his biggest tournament cash. He has made three other World Series of Poker final tables, one in 1994 and two in 2007 ($5,000 Mixed Hold 'Em and £2,500 H.O.R.S.E.).

As of 2008, his total live tournament winnings exceed $2,900,000. His nine cashes as the WSOP account for $525,769 of those winnings.

Notes

American poker players
World Series of Poker bracelet winners
Living people
Year of birth missing (living people)